The Alberta Cooperative Grocery is a food cooperative located in Portland, Oregon.  Founded in 1997 as a food-buying club, the co-op opened its doors in 2001.  It is owned by over 1000 member owners and is a member of the National Cooperative Grocers Association.

Food and drink companies based in Portland, Oregon
1997 establishments in Oregon